Propaganda Games was a Canadian video game development studio based in Vancouver, British Columbia, founded by Josh Holmes in 2005, and bought by Disney Interactive Studios, the interactive subsidiary of the Walt Disney Company at the same year. In January 2011, Propaganda Games was closed.

History
Buena Vista Games formed the new studio with former employees of EA Canada in April 2005. 
They acquired the Turok license in May 2005, which was released in 2008 for the current generation consoles at the time. A sequel, Turok 2, was in development soon after but was canceled due to layoffs.

Once work was completed on Tron: Evolution and the proposed Pirates of the Caribbean title was cancelled, Disney closed the studio in January 2011.

Games

References

External links

Defunct video game companies of Canada
Video game development companies
Companies based in Vancouver
Canadian companies established in 2005
Canadian companies disestablished in 2011
Video game companies established in 2005
Video game companies disestablished in 2011
Disney Interactive
Defunct companies of British Columbia
2005 establishments in British Columbia
2011 disestablishments in British Columbia